Cardites antiquatus is a species of marine bivalve molluscs, in the family Carditidae.

Description

Distribution and habitat
This species is native to the Mediterranean Sea. It lives in muddy and sandy seabed at depths of 5 to 45 m.

References 
WoRMS

Carditidae
Molluscs described in 1758
Taxa named by Carl Linnaeus